Allan Moon (born January 6, 1976) is a Canadian / Israeli artist, poet, singer-songwriter and producer. Moon was born in Toronto, Ontario, Canada and grew up in the Upper West Side of New York City.  In 1992, Moon emigrated to Tel Aviv, Israel. He currently lives in the north Galilee region of Israel.

Music 
Moon's first music release was a 5-song demo EP in 2006 which included Song of the Wind and a hidden tracked acoustic cover version to Billy Joel's Uptown Girl. The demo paved the way to his first full-length album Song of the Wind.

Song of the Wind, was released in 2008 and saw Moon's songwriting as a direct progression from his poetry coupled with country life.  The album was characterized by acoustic guitars and Moon's soft, almost breaking voice, reminiscent of Neil Young.  The album received favorable reviews, the magazine Americana UK compared his writing to that of Nick Drake and John Martyn.

"...Very straight ahead, personal, even disturbing at times. I liked "Song of the Wind" a lot. It's such a sad song, delivered so delicately. The images of loss are really poetic, and each one tells a complete story in two lines. Very strong stuff ..." – David Kahne – Producer 

Later in 2008, Moon was called upon to produce Yuval Banai's 4th solo album Me'ever Le'Harim (Beyond the Mountains).  Banai is lead singer of Israel's premier rock band Mashina, a multi-platinum selling act who's been active since the early 1980s.  In Me'ever Le'Harim, Moon took Banai in a new musical direction, towards folk and Americana, lap-steel guitars and stripped down productions.

Children of the Call, Moon's second studio album was released in 2014. The album features a roster of Israel's top indie musicians, including: Geva Alon, Uzi Ramirez, Ophir "Kutiman" Kutiel, Uri Brauner Kinrot, Eyal Talmudi, Adam Scheflan and Karolina.  Musically, the album was varied in genres: Folk, Rhythm and Blues, Funk and psychedelic.

In 2015, he released Analog Memories, a compilation EP of demos and outtakes, including the original demo for the song Light Up which was released by Boom Pam.

In 2019, he released the digital single The Art of Rolling, produced by Adam Scheflan and Tamir Muskat of Balkan Beat Box.

Poetry
Upon arriving in Tel Aviv, Moon broke into the English language poetry scene, participating in underground readings and performances reminiscent of the Beat Generation poets. His poetic style was raw and druggy, with sexual innuendos, often compared to William S. Burroughs. 
<blockquote>

"...Moon's poems are authentic photographs of written experience as a kind of sustained ecstatic fictional, (auto)biographical experience. Moon sort of milks an orgasm in his best poems, and leaves the technique floundering for a philosophy. His work contains none of the moral/linguistic imperatives of Bernstein, nor the violent ejaculations of Burroughs, and in its own right becomes a poem distinctly his own." – by Elazar from a preface to ARC 15 – Journal of the Israel Association of Writers in English'</blockquote>

In 1997, Moon published his first book of titled Word Felon, a collection of poems from 1992–1996 which he had been performing with. The poetic style of Felon, was language deconstruction, broken rhymes and freestyles, inspired by his growing up in the rap culture of 1980s New York City.  Most of the poems' dealt with a dark portrayal of underground big city culture, drugs, sex and personal alienation, through the eyes of a lost boy.  After Word Felon, Moon focused on mixed-media art experiments; combining art, photography, graphic design and poetry. These works would finally see light in 2002 under the project title: Phoetry, Moon's coining for Photo & Poetry.Phoetry was published as a book which coincided with an art exhibition of the same name.  The book contained poems and their visual interpretations, in the form of photographs, graphic designs and sketches.  The exhibition ran in two galleries in Tel Aviv from 2002 through 2003, and it featured "blow-ups" of the visuals in the book. Phoetry''' found Moon more mature and reconciled, the poems were colored with love, relationship and a newfound affection of nature.

Moon's poems and translations have been featured in several publications around the world.

References

External links
Official Site

1976 births
Living people
Musicians from Toronto
Jewish songwriters
Jewish poets
Canadian male singer-songwriters
Jewish Canadian musicians
Canadian folk singer-songwriters
20th-century Canadian poets
Canadian male poets
Jewish folk singers
Writers from Toronto
20th-century Canadian male writers
21st-century Canadian male singers